Iskhodnaya, is a mountain in the Chantal Range. Administratively it is part of the Chukotka Autonomous Okrug, Russian Federation.

Geography
It rises just above the northern bank of the high course of the Chantalvergyrgyn River.

The height of the summit is  according to the Great Soviet Encyclopedia. The same mountain is marked as a  peak in the C-8 sheet of the Defense Mapping Agency Navigation charts.

See also
Highest points of Russian Federal subjects
List of mountains in Russia

References

Mountains of Chukotka Autonomous Okrug
Chukotka Mountains
Highest points of Russian federal subjects